Tsai Hui-min (born 6 February 1976) is a former Taiwanese badminton player. She represented Chinese Taipei at the 1996 and 2000 Summer Olympics in the women's doubles event partnered with Chen Li-chin. They were one of eight pairs that qualified and competed at the 2000 World Grand Prix Finals in Brunei.

Achievements

Asian Championships 
Women's doubles

IBF World Grand Prix 
The World Badminton Grand Prix sanctioned by International Badminton Federation (IBF) since 1983.

Women's doubles

IBF International 
Women's doubles

References

External links
 
 

1976 births
Living people
Taiwanese female badminton players
Olympic badminton players of Taiwan
Badminton players at the 2000 Summer Olympics
Badminton players at the 1996 Summer Olympics
Badminton players at the 1998 Asian Games
Asian Games competitors for Chinese Taipei